Quiñones or Quiñónez is a surname. Notable people with the surname include:

Álex Quiñónez (1989–2021), Ecuadorian sprinter
Alfonso Quiñónez Molina (1874–1950), President of El Salvador 1918–1919 and 1923–1927
Alfredo Quiñones-Hinojosa, neurosurgeon
Anairis Quiñones (born 1997), American voice actress
Carlos Andrés Quiñónez (born 1980), Ecuadorian footballer
Carlos Quiñónez (born 1977), Guatemalan football midfielder
Crispiniano Quiñones Quiñones (died 2000), Colombian Army General
Denise Quiñones (born 1980), the fourth Puerto Rican winner of the Miss Universe contest
Dennise Longo Quiñones, Puerto Rican lawyer and government official
Domingo Quiñones, singer of salsa music
Eleuterio Quiñones, recurring fictional character in Puerto Rican radio and television
Eloise Quiñones Keber, Professor of Art History at Baruch College and the CUNY Graduate Center
Ernesto Quiñónez American writer and journalist
Francisco de Quiñones (1482–1540), Spanish cardinal
Francisco de Quiñónez, Spanish soldier who was appointed as governor of Chile (May 1599 – June 1600)
Francisco Mariano Quiñones (1830–1908), proponent of the abolition of slavery and self-determination for Puerto Rico
Hólger Quiñónez (born 1962), retired soccer defender from Ecuador
Jackson Quiñónez (born 1980), Spanish hurdler of Afro-Ecuadorian descent
John Quiñones, ABC News correspondent
John Quiñones (politician) (born 1965), the first Republican of Puerto Rican ancestry elected to the Florida House of Representatives
José Luis Quiñónez (born 1984), Ecuadorian footballer
José María Gil-Robles y Quiñones (1898–1980), Spanish politician in the period leading up to the Spanish Civil War
José Quiñones Gonzales (1914–1941), Peruvian military aviator and national aviation hero
José Severo Quiñones, the first Chief Justice of the Supreme Court of Puerto Rico
Juan Gómez-Quiñones (born 1940), American historian, professor of history, poet, and activist
Juan Quiñónez (born 1987), Peruvian footballer
Lee Quiñones (born 1960), American graffiti artist
Lester Quiñones (born 2000), Dominican-American basketball player
Lorena Quiñones (born 1996), Puerto Rican artistic gymnast
Luciano Quiñones (born 1948), pianist and composer of Modern Puerto Rican Danzas
Luis Quiñones (born 1962), former utility infielder in Major League Baseball
Marc Quiñones, American percussionist, a player in salsa music, and a member of The Allman Brothers Band
Marcelo Quiñones (born 1949), former boxer from Peru
Michael Quiñónez (born 1984), Ecuadorian football attacking midfielder
Oscar Quiñones (born 1941), Peruvian chess master
Óscar Quiñones (1919–1987), Peruvian artist
Pedro Quiñónez (born 1986), Ecuadorian footballer
Rafael Quiñones Vidal (1892–1988), journalist; radio and TV Master of Ceremonies
Ray Quiñones (born 1958), retired Puerto Rican long jumper
Rey Quiñones (born 1963), Puerto Rican baseball infielder
Sam Quiñones (born 1958), American journalist
Samuel R. Quiñones (1903–1976), the fifth President of the Senate of Puerto Rico, from 1949 to 1968
Suero de Quiñones (1409–1458), Leonese knight and author
Víctor Quiñones (born 1960), the founder and owner of International Wrestling Association

See also
BAP Quiñones, several ships of the Peruvian navy
FAP Captain José Abelardo Quiñones González International Airport (IATA: CIX, ICAO: SPHI) is an airport serving Chiclayo, Peru and the surrounding metropolitan area

Spanish-language surnames